Scopalio is a monotypic genus of Indonesian sac spiders containing the single species, Scopalio verrens. It was first described by Christa L. Deeleman-Reinhold in 2001, and has only been found in Indonesia.

References

Clubionidae
Monotypic Araneomorphae genera
Spiders of Asia